Emily Wood (October 11, 1978 ) is a German actress.

Life and career
Wood became known through her performances in the Sat.1-comedy series Sechserpack. She also appeared in Alpha Team, Großstadtrevier, Der Ermittler and Schwarz greift ein, and as a guest in the Sat.1 show Clueless Genius: The Comedy Arena. After moving to Germany as a child (Düsseldorf, Frankfurt and Hamburg), she now lives in London, England.

Wood is the niece of the German journalist Ulrich Wickert and granddaughter of Erwin Wickert.

References

External links

 

1978 births
German comedy musicians
German television actresses
Living people
Actors from Düsseldorf